Russian is the most common first language in the Donbas and Crimea regions of Ukraine and the city of Kharkiv, and the predominant language in large cities in the eastern and southern portions of the country. The usage and status of the language is the subject of political disputes. Ukrainian is the country's only state language since the adoption of the 1996 Constitution, which prohibits an official bilingual system at state level but also guarantees the free development, use and protection of Russian and other languages of national minorities. In 2017 a new Law on Education was passed which restricted the use of Russian as a language of instruction. Nevertheless, Russian remains a widely used language in Ukraine in pop culture and in informal and business communication.

History of Russian language in Ukraine

The East Slavic languages originated in the language spoken in Rus in the medieval period. Significant differences in spoken language in different regions began after the division of the Rus lands between the Golden Horde (from about 1240) and the Grand Duchy of Lithuania. The Lithuanian  state eventually allied with the Kingdom of Poland in the Polish–Lithuanian Commonwealth of 1569–1795. Muscovites under the Golden Horde developed what became the modern Russian language; people in the northern Lithuanian sector developed Belarusian, and in the southern Polish sector Ukrainian.

The ethnonym "Ukrainian" for the south-eastern Slavic people did not become well-established until the 19th century, although English-speakers (for example) called those peoples' land "Ukraine" in English from before the 18th century (the Oxford English Dictionary traces the word "Ukrainian" in English back as far as 1804, and records its application to the Ukrainian language from 1886). The western part of the country, Austrian Galicia, Bukovina, and Carpathian Ruthenia, was generally known in German, French and English as "Ruthenia", and the people as "Ruthenians." The Russian imperial centre, however, preferred the names "Little" and "White" Russias for the Ukrainian and Belarusian lands respectively, as distinct from Great Russia.

No definitive geographical border separated people speaking Russian and those speaking Ukrainian – rather gradual shifts in vocabulary and pronunciation marked the areas between the historical cores of the languages.

Although Goriuns resided in the Putyvl region (in present-day northern Ukraine) in the times of Grand Duchy of Lithuania or perhaps even earlier, the Russian language mostly came through the migration of ethnic Russians to Ukraine and through the adoption of the Russian language by Ukrainians during the Russification of Ukraine.

Russian settlers
The first new waves of Russian settlers onto what is now Ukrainian territory came in the late-16th century to the empty lands of Slobozhanshchyna (in the region of Kharkiv) that Russia had gained from the Tatars, or from the Grand Duchy of Lithuania - although Ukrainian peasants from the Polish-Lithuanian west escaping harsh exploitative conditions outnumbered them.

More Russian speakers appeared in the northern, central and eastern territories of modern Ukraine during the late-17th century, following the Cossack Rebellion (1648–1657) which Bohdan Khmelnytsky led against Poland. The Khmelnytsky Uprising led to a massive movement of Ukrainian settlers to the Slobozhanshchyna region, which converted it from a sparsely inhabited frontier area to one of the major populated regions of the Tsardom of Russia. Following the Pereyaslav Rada of 1654 the northern and eastern parts of present-day Ukraine came under the hegemony of the Russian Tsardom. This brought the first significant, but still small, wave of Russian settlers into central Ukraine (primarily several thousand soldiers stationed in garrisons, out of a population of approximately 1.2 million non-Russians). Although the number of Russian settlers in Ukraine prior to the 18th century remained small, the local upper-classes within the part of Ukraine acquired by Russia came to use the Russian language widely.

Beginning in the late 18th century, large numbers of Russians (as well as of Armenians, Bulgarians, Greeks and of other christians and Jews, who fled the Ottoman Emprire) settled in newly acquired lands in what is now southern Ukraine, a region then known as Novorossiya ("New Russia"). These lands – previously known as the Wild Fields – had been sparsely populated prior to the 18th century due to the threat of Crimean-Tatar raids, but once Saint Petersburg had eliminated the Tatar state as a threat, Russian nobles were granted large tracts of fertile land for working by newly arrived peasants, most of them ethnic Ukrainians but many of them  Russians.

Dramatic increase of Russian settlers

The 19th century saw a dramatic increase in the urban Russian population in present-day Ukraine, as ethnic Russian settlers moved into and populated the newly industrialised and growing towns.  At the beginning of the 20th century the Russians formed the largest ethnic group in almost all large cities within Ukraine's modern borders, including  Kyiv (54.2%), Kharkiv (63.1%), Odesa (49.09%), Mykolaiv (66.33%), Mariupol (63.22%), Luhansk, (68.16%), Kherson (47.21%), Melitopol (42.8%), Ekaterinoslav, (41.78%), Kropyvnytskyi (34.64%), Simferopol (45.64%), Yalta (66.17%), Kerch (57.8%), Sevastopol (63.46%). The Ukrainian migrants who settled in these cities entered a Russian-speaking milieu (particularly with Russian-speaking administration) and needed to adopt the Russian language.

Suppression and fostering of the Ukrainian language
 
The Russian Empire promoted the spread of the Russian language among the native Ukrainian population, actively refusing to acknowledge the existence of a Ukrainian language.

Alarmed by the threat of Ukrainian separatism (in its turn influenced by the 1863 demands of Polish nationalists), the Russian Minister of Internal Affairs Pyotr Valuev in 1863 issued a secret decree that banned the publication of religious texts and educational texts written in the Ukrainian language<ref name="Miller">{{cite book| author= Miller, Alexei | title= The Ukrainian Question. The Russian Empire and Nationalism in the Nineteenth Century | location= Budapest-New York | publisher = Central European University Press | year = 203 | isbn = 963-9241-60-1 }}</ref> as non-grammatical, but allowed all other texts, including fiction.  The Emperor Alexander II in 1876 expanded this ban by issuing the Ems Ukaz (which lapsed in 1905).  The Ukaz banned all Ukrainian-language books and song-lyrics, as well as the importation of such works.  Furthermore, Ukrainian-language public performances, plays, and lectures were forbidden.  In 1881 the decree was amended to allow the publishing of lyrics and dictionaries, and the performances of some plays in the Ukrainian language with local officials' approval.  Ukrainian-only troupes were, however, forbidden. Approximately 9% of the population spoke Russian at the time of the Russian Empire Census of 1897. as opposed to 44.31% of the total population of the Empire.

In 1918 the Soviet Council of People's Commissars decreed that nationalities under their control had the right to education in their own language.
Thus Ukrainians in the Soviet era were entitled to study and learn in the Ukrainian language. During the Soviet times, the attitude to Ukrainian language and culture went through periods of promotion (policy of "korenization",   to ), suppression (during the subsequent period of Stalinism), and renewed Ukrainization (notably in the epoch of Khrushchev,  to 1964). Ukrainian cultural organizations, such as theatres or the Writers' Union, were funded by the central administration. While officially there was no state language in the Soviet Union until 1990, Russian in practice had an implicitly privileged position as the only language widely spoken across the country. In 1990 Russian became legally the official all-Union language of the Soviet Union, with constituent republics having rights to declare their own official languages. The Ukrainian language, despite official encouragement and government funding, like other regional languages, was often frowned upon or quietly discouraged, which led to a gradual decline in its usage.

Ukrainization in modern Ukraine
 
Since the Euromaidan of 2013–2014, the Ukrainian government has issued several laws aimed at encouraging Ukrainization in the media, in education and in other spheres.

In February 2017, the Ukrainian government banned the commercial importation of books from Russia, which had accounted for up to 60% of all titles sold in Ukraine.

On May 23, 2017, the Ukrainian parliament approved the law that most broadcast content should be in Ukrainian (75% of national carriers and 50% of local carriers).

The 2017 law on education provides that Ukrainian language is the language of education at all levels except for one or more subjects that are allowed to be taught in two or more languages, namely English or one of the other official languages of the European Union (i.e. excluding Russian). The law does state that persons belonging to the indigenous peoples of Ukraine are guaranteed the right to study at public pre-school institutes and primary schools in "the language of instruction of the respective indigenous people, along with the state language of instruction" in separate classes or groups. The Parliamentary Assembly of the Council of Europe (PACE) has expressed concern with this measure and with the lack of "real consultation" with the representatives of national minorities. In July 2018, The Mykolaiv Okrug Administrative Court liquidated the status of Russian as a regional language, on the suit (bringing to the norms of the national legislation due to the recognition of the law "On the principles of the state language policy" by the Constitutional Court of Ukraine as unconstitutional) of the First Deputy Prosecutor of the Mykolaiv Oblast. In October and December 2018, parliaments of the city of Kherson and of Kharkiv Oblast also abolished the status of the Russian language as a regional one.

In January 2022, a law requiring all print media to be published in Ukrainian came into force. It did not ban publication in Russian, however it stipulated that a Ukrainian version of equivalent circulation and scope must be published – which is not a profitable option for publishers. Critics argue that the law could disenfranchise the country's Russian-speakers.

Current usage statistics

There is a large difference between the numbers of people whose native language is Russian and people who adopted Russian as their everyday communication language. Another thing to keep in mind is that the percentage of Russian-speaking citizens is significantly higher in cities than in rural areas across the whole country.

2001 Census
According to official data from the 2001 Ukrainian census, the Russian language is native for 29.6% of Ukraine's population (about 14.3 million people). Ethnic Russians form 56% of the total Russian-native-language population, while the remainder are people of other ethnic background: 5,545,000 Ukrainians, 172,000 Belarusians, 86,000 Jews, 81,000 Greeks, 62,000 Bulgarians, 46,000 Moldovans, 43,000 Tatars, 43,000 Armenians, 22,000 Poles, 21,000 Germans, 15,000 Crimean Tatars.

Therefore, the Russian-speaking population in Ukraine forms the largest linguistic group in modern Europe with its language being non-official in the state. The Russian-speaking population of Ukraine constitutes the largest Russophone community outside the Russian Federation.

Polls
According to July 2012 polling by RATING, 50% of the surveyed adult residents over 18 years of age considered their native language to be Ukrainian, 29% said Russian, 20% identified both Russian and Ukrainian as their native language, 1% gave another language. 5% could not decide which language is their native one. Almost 80% of respondents stated they did not have any problems using their native language in 2011. 8% stated they had experienced difficulty in the execution (understanding) of official documents; mostly middle-aged and elderly people in South Ukraine and the Donbas.

According to a 2004 public opinion poll by the Kyiv International Institute of Sociology, the number of people using Russian language in their homes considerably exceeds the number of those who declared Russian as their native language in the census. According to the survey, Russian is used at home by 43–46% of the population of the country (in other words a similar proportion to Ukrainian) and Russophones make a majority of the population in Eastern and Southern regions of Ukraine:

 Autonomous Republic of Crimea — 97% of the population
 Dnipropetrovsk Oblast — 72%
 Donetsk Oblast — 93%
 Luhansk Oblast — 89%
 Zaporizhzhia Oblast — 81%
 Odesa Oblast — 85%
 Kharkiv Oblast — 74%
 Mykolaiv Oblast — 66%

Russian language dominates in informal communication in the capital of Ukraine, Kyiv. It is also used by a sizeable linguistic minority (4-5% of the total population) in Central and Western Ukraine.  83% of Ukrainians responding to a 2008 Gallup poll preferred to use Russian instead of Ukrainian to take the survey.

According to data obtained by the "Public opinion" foundation (2002), the population of the oblast centres prefers to use Russian (75%). Continuous Russian linguistic areas occupy certain regions of Crimea, Donbas, Slobozhanshchyna, southern parts of Odesa and Zaporizhzhia oblasts, while Russian linguistic enclaves exist in central and northern Ukraine.

Russian language in Ukrainian politics

The Russian language in Ukraine is recognized (along with all other languages) as the "language of a national minority". Ukrainian is the only state language; every other language is declared to be the "language of a national minority" in the Constitution of Ukraine adopted by the parliament in 1996, but only Russian is explicitly named. Article 10 of the Constitution reads: "In Ukraine, the free development, use and protection of Russian, and other languages of national minorities of Ukraine, is guaranteed". The Constitution declares Ukrainian language as the state language of the country, while other languages spoken in Ukraine are guaranteed constitutional protection, but are not in practice protected from book bans. The Ukrainian language was adopted as the state language by the Law on Languages adopted in Ukrainian SSR in 1989; Russian was specified as the language of communication with the other republics of Soviet Union. Ukraine signed the European Charter on Regional or Minority Languages in 1996, but it was only partially ratified, and only in 2002 by the Parliament

The issue of Russian receiving the status of second official language has been the subject of extended controversial discussion ever since Ukraine became independent in 1991. In every Ukrainian election, many politicians, such as former president Leonid Kuchma, were elected by Ukrainians after making Russian language rights a key part of their platform. The recent President of Ukraine, Viktor Yanukovych continued this practice when he was opposition leader. In an interview with Kommersant, during the 2010 Ukrainian presidential election-campaign, he stated that the status of Russian in Ukraine "is too politicized" and said that if elected president in 2010, he would "have a real opportunity to adopt a law on languages, which implements the requirements of the European Charter of regional languages". He implied this law would need 226 votes in the Ukrainian parliament (50% of the votes instead of the 75% of the votes needed to change the constitution of Ukraine). After his early 2010 election as president, Yanukovych stated (on March 9, 2010) "Ukraine will continue to promote the Ukrainian language as its only state language". At the same time, he stressed that it also necessary to develop other regional languages.

In 1994, a referendum took place in the Donetsk Oblast and the Luhansk Oblast, with around 90% supporting the Russian language gaining status of an official language alongside Ukrainian, and for the Russian language to be an official language on a regional level, but it was ignored by Parliament.

Former president Viktor Yushchenko, during his 2004 Presidential campaign, also claimed a willingness to introduce more equality for Russian speakers. His clipping service spread an announcement of his promise to make Russian language proficiency obligatory for officials who interact with Russian-speaking citizens. In 2005 Yushchenko stated that he had never signed this decree project. The controversy was seen by some as a deliberate policy of Ukrainization.Tatyana Krynitsyna, Два языка - один народ, Kharkiv Branch of the Party of Regions, 09.12.2005

In 2006, the Kharkiv City Rada was the first to declare Russian to be a regional language. Following that, almost all southern and eastern oblasts (Luhansk, Donetsk, Mykolaiv, Kharkiv, Zaporizhzhia, and Kherson oblasts), and many major southern and eastern cities (Sevastopol, Dnipropetrovsk, Donetsk, Yalta, Luhansk, Zaporizhzhia, Kryvyi Rih, Odesa) followed suit. Several courts overturned the decision to change the status of the Russian language in the cities of Kryvyi Rih, Kherson, Dnipropetrovsk, Zaporizhzhia and Mykolaiv while in Donetsk, Mykolaiv and Kharkiv oblasts it was retained.

In August 2012, a law on regional languages entitled any local language spoken by at least a 10% minority to be declared official within that area. Russian was within weeks declared as a regional language in several southern and eastern oblasts and cities. On 23 February 2014, a bill repealing the law was approved by 232 deputies out of 450 but not signed into law by acting-president Oleksandr Turchynov. On 28 February 2018, the Constitutional Court of Ukraine ruled on the matter.

In December 2016, the importation of "anti-Ukrainian" books from Russia was restricted. In February 2017 the Ukrainian government completely banned the commercial importation of books from Russia, which had accounted for up to 60% of all titles sold.

Surveys on the status of the Russian language

According to a survey by the Research and Branding Group (June 2006), the majority of respondents supported the decisions of local authorities: 52% largely supported (including 69% of population of eastern oblasts and 56% of southern regions), 34% largely did not support the decisions, 9% – answered "partially support and partially not", 5% had no opinion. According to an all-Ukrainian poll carried out in February 2008 by "Ukrainian Democratic Circle" 15% of those polled said that the language issue should be immediately solved, in November 2009 this was 14.7%; in the November 2009 poll 35.8% wanted both the Russian and Ukrainian language to be state languages.

According to polling by RATING, the level of support for granting Russian the status of a state language decreased (from 54% to 46%) and the number of opponents increased (from 40% to 45%) between 2009 and May 2012; in July 2012 41% of respondents supported granting Russian the status of a state language and 51% opposed it. (In July 2012) among the biggest supporters of bilingualism were residents of the Donets Basin (85%), South Ukraine (72%) and East Ukraine (50%). A further poll conducted by RATING in September–October 2012 found 51% opposed granting official status to the Russian language, whereas 41% supported it. The largest regions of support were Donbas (75%), southern (72%) and eastern (53%), whereas nearly 70% of northern and central Ukraine, and 90% of western Ukraine were in opposition. A survey conducted in February 2015 by the Kyiv International Institute of Sociology found that support for Russian as a state language had dropped to 19% (37% in the south, 31% in Donbas and other eastern oblasts). 52% (West: 44%, Central: 57%; South: 43%; East: 61%) said that Russian should be official only in regions where the majority wanted it and 21% said it should be removed from official use.

Other surveys
As reported by the Russian-language REGNUM News Agency, it found that "68% of Ukrainians are fluent in Russian and 57% are fluent in Ukrainian."

Although a census conducted in Ukrainian showed that Russian speakers comprise about 30% (2001 census), 39% of Ukrainians interviewed in a 2006 survey believed that the rights of Russophones were violated because the Russian language is not official in the country, whereas 38% had the opposite position.

According to a poll carried out by the Social Research Center at the National University of Kyiv-Mohyla Academy in late 2009 ideological issues were ranked third (15%) as reasons to organize mass protest actions (in particular, the issues of joining NATO, the status of the Russian language, the activities of left- and right-wing political groups, etc.); behind economic issues (25%) and problems of ownership (17%). According to a March 2010 survey, forced Ukrainization and Russian language suppression are of concern to 4.8% of the population.

According to 2016-2017 polls by the Kyiv International Institute of Sociology, Rating, and GfK Ukraine, about 1% of respondents across the country, and fewer than 3% of respondents in eastern parts of Ukraine, found the status of the Russian language to be an important political issue. The same 2017 polls indicated 64% support for state policies favoring the usage of the Ukrainian language.

Use of Russian in specific spheres

Russian literature of Ukraine

Historically, many famous writers of Russian literature were born and lived in Ukraine. Nikolai Gogol is probably the most famous example of shared Russo-Ukrainian heritage: Ukrainian by descent, he wrote in Russian, and significantly contributed to culture of both nations. Russian author Mikhail Bulgakov was born in Kyiv, as well as poet Ilya Erenburg. A number of notable Russian writers and poets hailed from Odesa, including Ilya Ilf and Yevgeny Petrov, Anna Akhmatova, Isaak Babel. Russian child poet Nika Turbina was born in Yalta, Crimea.

A significant number of contemporary authors from Ukraine write in Russian. This is especially notable within science fiction and fantasy genres. Kharkiv is considered the "capital city" of Ukrainian sci-fi and fantasy, it is home to several popular Russophone Ukrainian writers, such as H. L. Oldie (pen name for Oleg Ladyzhensky and Dmitry Gromov), Alexander Zorich, Andrei Valentinov, and Yuri Nikitin. Science fiction convention Zvezdny Most (Rus. for "Star Bridge") is held in Kharkiv annually. Russophone Ukrainian writers also hail from Kyiv, those include Marina and Sergey Dyachenko and Vladimir Arenev. Max Frei hails from Odesa, and Vera Kamsha was born in Lviv. Other Russophone Ukrainian writers of sci-fi and fantasy include Vladimir Vasilyev, Vladislav Rusanov, Alexander Mazin and Fyodor Berezin. RBG-Azimuth, Ukraine's largest sci-fi and fantasy magazine, is published in Russian, as well as now defunct Realnost Fantastiki.

Outside science fiction and fantasy, there is also a number of Russophone realist writers and poets. Ukrainian literary magazine Sho listed Alexander Kabanov, Boris Khersonsky, Andrey Polyakov, Andrey Kurkov and Vladimir Rafeyenko as best Russophone Ukrainian writers of 2013.

According to H. L. Oldie, writing in Russian is an easier way for Ukrainian authors to be published and reach a broader audience. The authors say that it is because of Ukraine's ineffective book publishing policy: while Russian publishers are interested in popular literature, Ukrainian publishers rely mostly on grant givers. Many Ukrainian publishers agree and complain about low demand and low profitability for books in Ukrainian, compared to books in Russian.

In the media
A 2012 study showed that:
 on the radio, 3.4% of songs were in Ukrainian while 60% were in Russian
 over 60% of newspapers, 83% of journals and 87% of books were in Russian
 28% of TV programs were in Ukrainian, even on state-owned channels

Russian-language programming is sometimes subtitled in Ukrainian, and commercials during Russian-language programs are in Ukrainian on Ukraine-based media.

On March 11, 2014, amidst pro-Russian unrest in Ukraine, the Ukrainian National Council on Television and Radio Broadcasting shut down the broadcast of Russian television channels Rossiya 24, Channel One Russia, RTR Planeta, and NTV Mir in Ukraine. Since 19 August 2014 Ukraine has blocked 14 Russian television channels "to protect its media space from aggression from Russia, which has been deliberately inciting hatred and discord among Ukrainian citizens".

In early June 2015, 162 Russian movies and TV series were banned in Ukraine because they were seen to contain popularization, agitation and/or propaganda for the 2014–15 Russian military intervention in Ukraine (this military intervention is denied by Russia). All movies that feature "unwanted" Russian or Russia-supporting actors were also banned.

On the Internet
Russian is by far the preferred language on websites in Ukraine (80.1%), followed by English (10.1%), then Ukrainian (9.5%). The Russian language version of Wikipedia is five times more popular within Ukraine than the Ukrainian one, with these numbers matching those for the 2008 Gallup poll cited above (in which 83% of Ukrainians preferred to take the survey in Russian and 17% in Ukrainian.)

While government organizations are required to have their websites in Ukrainian, Ukrainian usage of the Internet is mostly in the Russian language. According to DomainTyper, the top ranking .ua domains are google.com.ua, yandex.ua, ex.ua and i.ua, all of which use the Russian language as default. According to 2013 UIA research, four of the five most popular websites (aside from Google) in Ukraine were Russian or Russophone: those are Vkontakte, Mail.ru, Yandex,  and Odnoklassniki. The top Ukrainian language website in this rank is Ukr.net, which was only the 8th most popular, and even Ukr.net uses both languages interchangeably.

On May 15, 2017, Ukrainian president Poroshenko issued a decree that demanded all Ukrainian internet providers to block access to all most popular Russian social media and websites, including VK, Odnoklassniki, Mail.ru, Yandex citing matters of national security in the context of the war in Donbas and explaining it as a response to "massive Russian cyberattacks across the world".The Guardian. Ukraine blocks popular social networks as part of sanctions on Russia  Tuesday 16 May 2017 17.40 BST On the following day the demand for applications that allowed to access blocked websites skyrocketed in Ukrainian segments of App Store and Google Play. The ban was condemned by Human Rights Watch that called it "a cynical, politically expedient attack on the right to information affecting millions of Ukrainians, and their personal and professional lives", while head of Council of Europe expressed a "strong concern" about the ban.

In education
Among private secondary schools, each individual institution decides whether to study Russian or not.

The number of Russian-teaching schools has reduced since Ukrainian independence in 1991 and in 2021 it is much lower than the proportion of Russophones,"the number of Ukrainian secondary schools has increased to 15,900, or 75% of their total number. In all, about 4.5 million students (67.4% of the total) are taught in Ukrainian, in Russian – 2.1 million (31.7%)...""Annual Report of the Ukrainian Parliament Commissioner for Human Rights “On the situation with observance and protection of human rights and freedoms in Ukraine” for the period from April 14, 1998 till December 31, 1999"  but still higher than the proportion of ethnic Russians.

The Law on Education'' formerly granted Ukrainian families (parents and their children) a right to choose their native language for schools and studies. This was changed by a new law in 2017 that only allows the use of Ukrainian in secondary schools and higher.

Higher education institutions in Ukraine generally use Ukrainian as the language of instruction.

According to parliamentarians of the Supreme Council of Crimea, in 2010 90% students of Crimea were studying in Russian language schools. At the same time, only 7% of students in Crimea were studying in Ukrainian language schools. In 2012, the only Ukrainian boarding school (50 pupils) in Sevastopol was closed, and children who would not study in Russian language were to be transferred to a boarding school for children with intellectual disabilities.

In courts
Since 1 January 2010, court proceedings have been allowed to take place in Russian on mutual consent of parties. Citizens who are unable to speak Ukrainian or Russian are allowed to use their native language or the services of an interpreter.

In business
, business affairs in Ukraine were mainly dealt with in Russian. Advanced technical and engineering courses at the university level in Ukraine were taught in Russian, which was changed according to the 2017 law "On Education".

See also

 Russians in Ukraine
 Surzhyk
 Russian book ban in Ukraine
 Language ombudsman (Ukraine)
 Chronology of Ukrainian language suppression
 Russia–Ukraine relations

References

Further reading
  160 pages. 
  231 pages.
 
  264 pages. 
  384 pages.  and 
  256 pages. 
  417 pages. 
 
  213 pages. 

Ukraine
Languages of Ukraine
Russian-Ukrainian culture
Russia–Ukraine relations
Russification
Social history of Ukraine